Korten may refer to:

 , a village in the municipality of Nova Zagora, Sliven Province
 Korten Ridge, a geographical feature in Graham Land, Antarctica
 David Korten (born 1937), American author and political activist
 Fran Korten, wife of David, publisher of Yes! (U.S. magazine)
 Günther Korten (1898-1944), German colonel general and Chief of the General Staff of the Luftwaffe in World War II

See also